Marie France Anglade (17 July 1942 in Constantine, Algeria – 28 August 2014 in La Verrière, Île-de-France), was a French Algerian film actress.

Selected filmography 

 1991 : Toubab Bi : wife of the reception centre
 1990 : Faux et usage de faux : wife of Charles
 1988 : Sortis de route : mother
 1984 : Aldo et Junior
 1980 : Julien Fontanes, magistrat : Liliane
 1968 : Darling Caroline : Caroline de Bievre
 1967 : Le Plus Vieux Métier du monde : Catherine
 1966 : James Tont operazione D.U.E. : Helene 
 1965 : Le Lit à deux places : a spouse
 1965 : Twenty-Four Hours to Kill : Franzi Bertram
 1964 : Les Motorisées : Soeur Maria
 1964 : L'Huitre et la perle (TV) : a teacher
 1964 : Le Repas des fauves : Sophie
 1964 : How Do You Like My Sister? : Cécile
 1963 : Du mouron pour les petits oiseaux
 1963 : Les Veinards
 1963 : Les Bricoleurs : a candidate in the driver's licence
 1963 : Comment trouvez-vous ma soeur? : Cécile
 1963 : Clémentine chérie : Clémentine
 1962 : Les Dimanches de Ville d'Avray : Lulu
 1962 : La Dénonciation
 1962 : Comme un poisson dans l'eau : Florence
 1962 : Les Sept péchés capitaux
 1962 : Les Parisiennes : Une collègienne
 1961 : Le Rendez-vous de minuit : Fifine
 1959 : Guinguette : Figuration

External links 

 

1942 births
2014 deaths
People from Constantine, Algeria
French film actresses
French television actresses
Pieds-Noirs